The Mind Sports Olympiad (MSO) is an annual international multi-disciplined competition and festival for games of mental skill and mind sports. The inaugural event was held in 1997 in London with £100,000 prize fund and was described as possibly the biggest games festival ever held.

The MSO was the first event of its kind celebrating mental skills and awarding gold, silver and bronze medals for each event and was highly influential on the mind sports movement and competitions that have followed since. The main MSO tournament has been held every year in England.

In 2020,  due to the COVID-19 pandemic, for the first time, the entire MSO tournament was held online.

History 
The first Mind Sports Olympiad was held in London's Royal Festival Hall in 1997. It brought together an unprecedented number of strategy games and events. William Hartston in The Independent said, "The biggest gamesfest ever to hit these (or perhaps any other) shores".

The inaugural MSO along with a very large number of games, introduced two new events of their own creation the Pentamind and the Decamentathlon. These were two events to parallel the multi-event games in athletics of the modern pentathlon and the decathlon. This was part of the ambition to create an Olympics of the mind.

The Mind Sports Olympiad returned to London with sponsorship in both 1998 and 1999. Despite a falling out between the organisers a successful event was held in Alexandra Palace the next year in 2000.

During this time several satellite events were held around the world bearing the Mind Sports Olympiad name. These have occurred in Cambridge, England; Singapore; Seoul, South Korea; Milan, Italy; Oulu, Finland; and Prague, The Czech Republic.

The Mind Sports Olympiad main event continued to happen with smaller sponsorship and the tournaments were held at a number of different universities. The event was still going strong for the years 2001–2006. The main 2004 event featured a separate event for schools, featuring competitions and activities in chess, Go, quizzes and intelligence puzzles. But in 2007 the Mind Sports Olympiad was reduced to a much smaller venue in Potters Bar due to no sponsorship and no advertising. In 2008 the MSO saw a revival returning to a central London venue, the Royal Horticultural Halls, Westminster and again on 21–31 August 2009

The 2010 event was held at the Soho Theatre in London. In 2011, the Mind Sports Olympiad moved to a bigger venue, the University of London Union. The 16th MSO took place once again at the University of London Union in 18–27 August 2012, and similarly the 17th MSO was also at ULU.

The main MSO event remains truly international, because it is still regarded as the foremost competition for all-rounders especially the "coveted Pentamind World Championship", won in 2010 by Paco Garcia De La Banda from Spain, while the 2011, 2013, 2014 and 2016 Pentamind World Champion Andres Kuusk is from Estonia.

Structure of the Organisation

When the MSO was initially formed in 1997, the main organisers included David Levy, Tony Buzan, and Raymond Keene with David Levy being the original founder of the MSO concept.

As of 2012 the board running the MSO along with David Levy are Tony Corfe and Etan Ilfeld

Logo, medals, and awards

The Olympiad's logo depicted Ajax playing Achilles, used for their medals and awards
is based upon the famous depiction found on over 150 items of ancient pottery from around 500 BC
.
Probably based either on an item from The British Museum
or Vatican Museum collections.

Alongside bestowing titles of Olympiad and World Champions, the MSO organisers originally envisaged having their own ratings and ranks system, however, not all of these ideas came to pass.
The MSO continues to give its own ranks of up to International Grandmaster.

Venues 

The Mind Sports Olympiad main event was at large venues for the first four years before being reduced in size due to funding difficulties. It has been held annually since 1997 at the following locations in England:

 1997 Royal Festival Hall, London
 1998 Novotel Hotel, Hammersmith
 1999 Kensington Olympia, London
 2000 Alexandra Palace, London
 2001 South Bank University, London
 2002 Loughborough University, Loughborough
 2003 UMIST, Manchester
 2004 UMIST, Manchester
 2005 Manchester University, Manchester
 2006 Westminster University, London
 2007 United Reformed Church, Potters Bar
 2008 Royal Horticultural Halls, London
 2009 Royal Horticultural Halls, London
 2010 Soho Theatre, London
 2011 University of London Union, London
 2012 University of London Union, London
 2013 University of London Union, London
 2014 JW3, London
 2015 JW3, London
 2016 JW3, London
 2017 JW3, London
 2018 JW3, London
 2019 JW3, London
 2020 Held online
 2021 Held online
 2022 JW3, London

Games at the MSO 
The MSO consists mainly of single event competitions most of which are for the nominal title of Olympiad champion, though some trademarked games are authorised by the game designer and publishers as the official world championships. All games, whether an Olympiad or the official World championship, can count towards the Pentamind. Medals, and more recently trophies, are awarded for gold, silver and bronze positions in each competition as well as ranks, with similar awards for the top juniors in each event. In early Olympiads sponsorship allowed for generous financial prizes to go with many of the events. In recent years such prizes have been limited to a small number of events, usually as a result of specific outside sponsorship for that discipline.

Notable games include (most other references mention some of these): the well-known: chess, bridge, draughts, shogi, backgammon, Chinese chess (xiangqi), Othello, poker, cribbage, Mastermind; and many newer games like: Abalone, Bōku, Continuo, Entropy, Kamisado, Lines of Action (LOA), Pacru, TwixT

Pentamind
This was one of the Mind Sports Olympiad's original events. It was an attempt along with the decamentathlon to produce an event for all-rounders to parallel the Olympic Games with its events the decathlon and pentathlon. Unlike the decamentathlon's fixed format (see separate article) the pentamind has very little fixed format. It disallows using games that are considered too similar and normally requires a long event, but otherwise any five
events from the schedule could be used.

The Pentamind champion is the player with the highest numerical score in "pentamind points" from 5 valid events.
This is calculated using the formula 100 x (n - p) / (n - 1), where n is the number of players and p is the player's position in an event. The position is the position before tie-breaks and any split positions are shared amongst all of the tied players. When there are fewer than 10 players in a tournament, the score is multiplied by a secondary factor [p / (p + 1)].

The World Championship Pentamind event has been won five times by Demis Hassabis and Andres Kuusk.

 2022:  Andres Kuusk
 2021:  Maciej Brzeski
 2020:  Ankush Khandelwal
 2019:  Ankush Khandelwal
 2018:  Ankush Khandelwal
 2017:  James Heppell
 2016:  Andres Kuusk
 2015:  James Heppell
 2014:  Andres Kuusk
 2013:  Andres Kuusk and  Ankush Khandelwal
 2012:  Dario De Toffoli
 2011:  Andres Kuusk
 2010:  Paco Garcia de la Banda
 2009:  Martyn Hamer and  Tim Hebbes
 2008:  David M. Pearce
 2007:  David M. Pearce
 2006:  Jan Šťastna
 2005:  Tim Hebbes
 2004:  Alain Dekker
 2003:  Demis Hassabis
 2002:  Dario De Toffoli
 2001:  Demis Hassabis
 2000:  Demis Hassabis
 1999:  Demis Hassabis
 1998:  Demis Hassabis
 1997:  Kenneth J. Wilshire

Decamentathlon World Championships

The Decamentathlon World Championship was originally established as the main event to determine the best all-round games player in the world before being superseded by the Pentamind. The Decamentathlon comprises 10 events scored out of 100, lasting 4 hours largely consisting of examined papers.

The following eight mental skills have always been part of the Decamentathlon: memory skills, mental calculation, IQ, chess, Go, Othello, 8 by 8 draughts, and creative thinking. MSO also organizes Mental Calculation World Championship separately. The original two mental skills were bridge and Mastermind, although these have varied in recent years using Backgammon and most recently Sudoku as substitutes.

Abstract Games World Championships
The MSO introduced the Abstract Games world championship in 2008.

World Amateur Poker Championships
The first world amateur poker championships was held in 1998 as part of the second Mind Sports Olympiad. The inaugural event was criticised for the standard of the play and for the events unique feature as only being played for medals and not for money. However, since the poker internet revolution the event continued to flourish with increased numbers. The event also is open to under 18s which the MSO also gives a title since money doesn't change hands

The 2012 tournament consists of the best results from 5 of 7 pot limit poker tournaments in the following variants

7 Card Stud
5 Card Draw
Canadian Stud
Pineapple Hold'em
London Lowball
Texas Hold'em
Omaha (poker)

And formerly also featured other variants such as:

Heads Up Texas Hold'em
Razz
6 Card Lowball
Mexican Stud

See also
 List of world championships in mind sports
 Mind Sports Organisation
 World Mind Sports Games

References

External links
 MSO official website
 MSO website 2009-2013 (still active)
 MSO archives from StudioGiochi.com
 MEMORIAD - World Mental Olympics
 MSO Italian Competitors, Medals and Interviews

Multi-sport events in the United Kingdom
Mind sports competitions
Recurring events established in 1997
1997 establishments in England